Dembei ( Dembei) was a Japanese castaway who, through Vladimir Atlasov, provided Russia with some of its first knowledge of Japan.

He was a merchant clerk accompanying a fleet of "thirty transports laden with goods for Edo," which had been caught in a storm; they found their way to Kamchatka and were found by Atlasov in 1701 or 1702. Despite pleading to be brought back to Japan, Dembei and another young Japanese person (who did not survive long) were instead brought to Saint Petersburg, where he told Peter the Great what he could about Japan. He taught some of the Japanese language to a few Russians, making him the father of Japanese language education in Russia. He was baptized as Gabriel and spent the rest of his life in Saint Petersburg.

Although it is unlikely that Dembei had any significant knowledge of Japan's politics or military organization or anything else that might prove particularly strategic to the Russians, it roused Russia's interest for exploration of Kamchatka and the Kurils, and for attempting to open up trade with Japan.

Some time between 1714 and 1719, he met traveller John Bell who gave the following account:

See also
 Japanese people in Russia
 Martin Spanberg

References

Citations

Bibliography
McDougall, Walter (1993). Let the Sea Make a Noise: Four Hundred Years of Cataclysm, Conquest, War and Folly in the North Pacific. New York: Avon Books.
Sansom, George (1963). A History of Japan: 1615-1867. Stanford: Stanford University Press.
Lensen, George Alexander (1961). "The Russian Push Toward Japan: Russo-Japanese Relations, 1697-1895". American Slavic and East European Review, Vol. 20, pp. 320–321. .

Russian people of Japanese descent
Castaways
Eastern Orthodox Christians from Japan
Japanese emigrants to Russia
Year of birth unknown
Year of death unknown
Japan–Russia relations